St John's College is a college of the University of Durham, United Kingdom. It is one of only two "recognised colleges" of the university, the other being St Chad's. This means that it is financially and constitutionally independent of the university and has a greater degree of administrative independence than the other, "maintained", colleges. However, to maintain its status as a recognised college, the university council must approve the appointment of its principal and be notified of changes to its constitution.

St John's is Durham's second smallest college and comprises John's Hall for undergraduate and postgraduate students studying any university course and Cranmer Hall (named after Thomas Cranmer and with its own master or Warden), an Anglican theological college in the open evangelical tradition.

History 
Founded as a Church of England theological college in 1909, it became a full constituent college of the university in 1919.  In 1958 it was divided into Cranmer Hall theological college and the non-theological John's Hall.  The halls have always held to a broadly evangelical tradition.

In 1973 St John's became the first Durham undergraduate male college to admit female students, though Cranmer Hall had been admitting women ordinands since 1966.

St John's was the first Church of England theological college to have both a lay person and a woman as principal (Ruth Etchells).

The college has an advowson (a right to appoint clergy to a parish) over four benefices: Chester-le-Street and Stranton in the Diocese of Durham and jointly with other avowees the benefices of Doddington with Benwick and Wimblington, and St Mark with St Paul, Darlington. Previously, the patron had complete power to appoint the new priest, however that power is now exercised jointly with the local bishop and parish.

Buildings 

The college is formed from a number of Georgian houses on the Bailey between Durham Cathedral and the River Wear. The main house is Haughton House, named after Haughton Castle in Northumberland, the seat of the family of William Donaldson Cruddas who were early benefactors of the college and other Christian churches and charities in the north east of England. The houses which make up Cranmer Hall were once owned by the Bowes-Lyon family (the late Queen Elizabeth The Queen Mother's family).
The majority of the college buildings are grade II listed, with parts of 3 and 4 South Bailey grade II* listed. Before coming into the possession of St John's, Linton House, no 1 South Bailey, was the main property of St. Chad's College.  It is said to have much earlier origins, with the frontage seen today added to an existing timber-framed building after the Restoration of the Monarchy in 1660.

No 2 South Bailey has distinctive circular "blind" windows which were revealed during a re-rendering in the 1980s. This enabled Martin Roberts, then Durham City's conservation officer, to date the building precisely to the late 17th century.

The illogically interconnected nature of many of the college buildings regularly results in visitors becoming lost. The similarly unusual nature of college stairways, one of which disappears into a solid wall, adds an element of Escher to the architecture.

The college chapel, dedicated to St Mary and known as St Mary the Less, is of Norman origin and was rebuilt in the 1840s and re-ordered at the turn of the 21st century. It became the college chapel in 1919, before which it had been the parish church of the South Bailey.  It is still a chapel of ease in the Parish of St Oswald. The chapel is also used by the local Greek Orthodox congregation.

Student life 
Owing to its small population, Johnians tend to know one another regardless of year, course or accommodation (all first years and the majority of finalists live in college, with the second years required to find their own accommodation). Elected Freshers Reps are generally well known throughout college thereby giving new Johnians more opportunities for one-on-one interaction, providing a more solid foundation in their first few weeks than in the larger colleges.

St John's participates in a number of sports such as cross country running, mixed lacrosse, rowing, men's football, badminton, hockey and rugby among others. St John's College Boat Club was founded in 1910 and operates out of two boathouses on the River Wear. The college's theatre company, Bailey Theatre Company, is ratified by Durham Student Theatre and is open to any member of the university. Their 2019 performance of Alan Ayckbourn's "Family Circles", produced in collaboration with St. Chad's, featured a cast and production team formed entirely from first-year students. Other performances include Sarah Kane's 4.48 Psychosis in the Epiphany term of 2009 and Arthur Miller's The Crucible in the Michaelmas term of 2008. The company also puts on an annual Shakespeare performance after university examinations in the summer. This traditionally involves an outdoor performance on Library Lawn, though the college's newly refurbished amphitheatre was used in 2019. In 2008, the society's performance of Christopher Marlowe's Doctor Faustus won the Durham Student Theatre Award for Best Play.

John's Music Society, founded in 2012, is the governing body for music within college. It regularly puts on large-scale concerts and helps students set up new musical ensembles as well as organising socials and concert trips for its members. The society is also responsible for organising popular open mic nights and the annual JMS BBQ.

Senior college figures

List of principals 

 1909–1911 Sidney Nowell Rostron
 1911–1919 Dawson Dawson-Walker
 1919–1945 Charles Steel Wallis
 1945–1953 Ronald Williams
 1954–1955 G.J. Cumming (acting)
 1954–1969 Jim P. Hickinbotham
 1970–1978 John C. P. Cockerton
 1978–1988 Ruth Etchells
 1988–1992 Anthony Thiselton
 1992–1999 David V. Day
 1999–2006 Stephen Sykes
 2006–present David Wilkinson

List of wardens 
 1968–1970: John C.P. Cockerton (formerly Chaplain to Cranmer Hall)
 1971–1979: Tim Yeats
 1979–1983: Christopher Byworth
 1983–1992: Ian Cundy
 1993–1996: John Pritchard
 1996–2004: Steven Croft
 2005–2011: Anne Dyer
 2011–2016: Mark Tanner
 2017–present: Philip Plyming

Notable alumni

John's Hall 
 Richard Adams, pioneer of fair trade and founder of Traidcraft
 Norman Aspin – High Commissioner to Malta
 James Bell, Bishop of Knaresborough, area Bishop for Ripon
 Richard Blackburn, Bishop of Warrington
 Mark Bryant, Bishop of Jarrow
 Douglas Davies, theologian
 Gavin Hewitt – special correspondent for BBC News
 Jack Plumley, Sir Herbert Thompson Professor of Egyptology, Cambridge; trained for ordination at St John's college before the theological college was split off into Cranmer Hall
 Nick Ramsay AM, Conservative Assembly Member for Monmouth and Shadow Finance Minister
 Rachel Schofield – journalist and BBC News presenter

Cranmer Hall

Both 
 Michael Beasley, Bishop of Hertford
 Chris Edmondson, former Bishop of Bolton
 Robert Paterson, former Bishop of Sodor and Man
 Geoff Pearson, Bishop of Lancaster
 John Saxbee, former Bishop of Lincoln
 Richard Turnbull, Principal of Wycliffe Hall, Oxford
 Justin Welby, Archbishop of Canterbury

Gallery

References

Further reading

 Craig, Amabel. (2009) Fides Nostra Victoria: A Portrait of St John's College, Durham, Third Millennium Publishing
 Yates, T.E. (2001) A College Remembered (second edition). Spennymoor, County Durham: MacDonald Press Ltd.

External links 
 St John's College official website
 Cranmer Hall official website
 St John's Common Room undergraduate student organisation
 Theology and Ministry on-line journal hosted by St John's College, Durham

 
Colleges of Durham University
Grade II listed buildings in County Durham
Grade II* listed buildings in County Durham
Bible colleges, seminaries and theological colleges in England
Anglican seminaries and theological colleges
Evangelicalism in the Church of England
Educational institutions established in 1909
Grade II listed educational buildings
1909 establishments in England